Raphaël Etifier (24 October 1889, in Le Prêcheur – 10 July 1966, in Paris) was a communist politician from Martinique who was elected in 1947 to represent the République du Moyen-Congo in the French senate from 1947 to 1948. After study at the lycée Victor Schœlcher in Fort-de-France, he was admitted to the École nationale des Arts et métiers of Aix-en-Provence, after which he worked as an engineer in public works in colonial Africa.

References 

Raphaël Etifier page on the French  senate website

Martiniquais politicians
French communists
French Senators of the Fourth Republic
French people of Martiniquais descent
1889 births
1966 deaths
Senators of French Equatorial Africa